The 1989 Women's NCM World Open Squash Championship was the women's edition of the 1989 World Open, which serves as the individual world championship for squash players. The event took place in Warmond in the Netherlands between 5 March and 19 March 1989. Martine Le Moignan won the World Open title, defeating Susan Devoy in the final.

Seeds

Draw and results

Finals

Top half

Bottom half

Notes
World number one Susan Devoy suffered a rare defeat at the hands of Martine Le Moignan in the final.

Robyn Lambourne was formerly Robyn Friday.

Liz Irving defeated Sarah Fitz-Gerald 9-5 9-2 9-1 in the third place play off.

References

External links
Womens World Open

Women's World Open Squash Championship 
World Squash Championships
Squash tournaments in the Netherlands
Women's World Open Squash Championship 
World Open Squash Championship 
Women's World Open Squash Championship 
International sports competitions hosted by the Netherlands